The fourth season of Vietnam Idol aired on August 17, 2012. This year sees some major changes in the show's structure. Mỹ Tâm joins the judging panel as the replacement for Siu Black while Quốc Trung and Nguyễn Quang Dũng remains on the panel. Huy Khánh takes over as the host for this season. This season will follow the same format as American Idol season 11. Vietnam Idol used the new title screen and logo with a different font started from Spectacular round.

The winner will receive: 600 million VND in cash ($30,000), 1-year promotion on MTV Vietnam as well as support for making a music video from the channel.

Process

Auditions 
Auditions started on July 4, 2012 in Da Nang and took place in several cities and towns in Vietnam; however, there was only 60 golden tickets given out during the auditions.

Theater round 
Top 60 contestants were chosen to advance to the Theater round in Ho Chi Minh City. After the first elimination, 32 contestants remained and were divided into 8 groups. The judges picked out the top 16, including 8 girls and 8 boys for the semi-final.

Semi-finals 
Semifinals round began on September 14, consisting of two nights. In first round for boys, two were chosen by judges and two were saved through public votes. The lowest public-voted of the remaining four were automatically out and the rest sang off in order to get a wild card to final rounds. The second round for girls was on September 21 with the same rules.

Males

Females

Wild Card round

Finals 

The finals began two weeks after the semi-finals had concluded.

Each week the finalist perform live on stage to a television audience. The contestant receiving the least viewers' votes are eliminated from the competition. Introduced for the first time this season is the ability of the judges to collectively override the voters' decision once, if they deem that a contestant has been voted-out prematurely. However, this results in two contestants eliminated the following week instead of one.

From top 10 – top 6: 3 judges intensity

Top 10 – Who Are You? 
Guest mentor: Quốc Thiên & Uyên Linh

Top 9 – Exciting Music 
Guest mentor: Mỹ Tâm

Top 8 – We Are the World 
Guest mentor: Thanh Bùi

Top 7 – Đức Trí & Lưu Thiên Hương 
Guest mentor: Đức Trí & Lưu Thiên Hương

Top 6 – Anh Quân & Võ Thiện Thanh 
Guest mentor: Anh Quân & Võ Thiện Thanh

Top 6 Redux – No Love Song Music 
Guest mentor: Mỹ Linh

Top 4 – Duets 
Guest mentor: Lệ Quyên
Resuit: Hương Giang was eliminated

Top 3 – Contestant's Choice, Judges' choice 
Guest mentor: Quốc Trung & Mỹ Tâm

Top 2 Finale – Contestant's Choice, Huy Tuấn's Choice, International Music 
Guest Mentor: Mỹ Linh

Grand Finale 
The grand finale took place in Quân khu 7 Stadium. 2,500 tickets out of over 25,000 were invitational; therefore, some tickets left were scalped up to 500,000 to 700,000 VND each. The show started at 8 pm (local time) and were broadcast live on VTV3. Mỹ Linh, previously mentors on the show, performed with the two finalists – Hoàng Quyên and Ya Suy. The show's judge Mỹ Tâm performed together with Ya Suy. Huy Tuấn, Mỹ Tâm, Huy Khánh announced the winner of the season was Ya Suy  from Lâm Đồng. Suy then performed the winning song Giây phút khát khao.

Musical Performance 
"Phút giây ngọt ngào" – Hoàng Quyên & Ya Suy
"Ngày mai nắng lên em sẽ về" – Male Finalists
"Ơ hay" – Female Finalists
"Nơi tình yêu bắt đầu" – Yasuy
"Và em có anh" – Hoàng Quyên
"Mưa và nỗi nhớ" – Bảo Trâm & Anh Quân
"Cho người nơi ấy" – Uyên Linh
"Tình về nơi đâu" – Ya Suy & Mỹ Tâm
"I'll Be There" – Hoàng Quyên & Thanh Bùi
"Anh mang theo mùa xuân" – Văn Mai Hương
"Ngôi sao ước mơ" – Top 8"
"LK Đánh thức bình minh", "Đen Trắng" – Mỹ Tâm
"Phút giây khát khao" – Ya Suy

Finalist

Elimination chart 
{{center|

Results show performances

References 
List of television programmes broadcast by Vietnam Television (VTV)

Vietnam Idol
2010s Vietnamese television series
2012 Vietnamese television seasons
2013 Vietnamese television seasons